Joe's Cable Car Restaurant was a restaurant founded in 1965, and owned and operated by Joe Obegi until 2014. The restaurant was a popular tourists' destination, which was featured on Diners, Drive-Ins and Dives in 2008. Though it was a popular landmark on Mission Street in the Excelsior District of San Francisco, it closed in 2014. As of January 2021, the building that Joe Obegi's restaurant occupied is slated to be demolished.

References

Restaurants in San Francisco
Defunct restaurants in the San Francisco Bay Area
Restaurants established in 1965
Restaurants disestablished in 2014
1965 establishments in California
2014 disestablishments in California